There are eleven residential colleges of the University of Queensland.

Colleges

Cromwell College

 On the St Lucia campus. Was the first of the Colleges on the St Lucia campus in June 1954, and admitted men only until it became co-ed in 1973.
 Founded in 1950 and initially funded by a private donation from the Hancock family
 Its emblem is a lion
 Has five buildings (17 Corridors) named after influential people in Cromwell's history: North, Thatcher / Dowling, Hancock, Begbie and Lockley.

Duchesne College

 On the St Lucia Campus, among ten other university residential colleges.
 Founded in 1937, initially at Stuartholme College in Toowong, by a collaboration of the university, the Catholic Archdiocese and under the auspices of the Sisters of the Sacred Heart, at the request of Archbishop James Duhig
 Moved to St Lucia after a new collegiate building was constructed at the university for it in 1959.
 Named after Rose Philippine Duchesne, a French woman who was instrumental in bringing the Society of the Sacred Heart to America from France.
 One of two all-female colleges on the campus.
 Accommodates 212 students.
 In 2009, the college opened the Rose Philippine Wing.
 Mission is to provide accommodation for rural and regional students who wish to study at UQ, QUT or ACU.

Emmanuel College

 Celebrating its 110th Anniversary in 2021, Emmanuel is jointly (with St John's) the oldest residential college affiliated with The University of Queensland
 Academic program encompasses 80+ hours of discipline-based tutorials each week, language courses, Masters classes, visiting scholars, and academic mentoring.
 Offers scholarships and bursaries to assist students.
 Hosts annual Theatre Restaurant entirely written and performed by the Students' Club.
 Its eleven wings (dormitories) are named after influential people in the college's history: Busch, Douglas, Drewe, Edmonds, Gibson, Glaister, Henderson, MacGregor, Martin, Meiklejohn and Merrington.
 Boasts more alumni who have played for the Wallabies than any other College at UQ.
 On-site student- staffed cafe (BrewDogs), basketball/netball court, squash courts and cardio gym. Student fees include access to UQ gym and pool.
 Active sporting, social and community focussed Students Club.

Grace College

 Women only until 2021, became gender inclusive in 2022
 After IH, and ahead of Johns, has the most international students, "with more than one-third of our residents coming from outside Australia"(2018)
 Located at the St Lucia Campus
 Opened in 1970
 Residents referred to as Gracies
 Smallest Residential College on campus
 Sister college of Kings

Gatton Halls of Residence

 Main university residential facilities for the Gatton campus.
 Largest residential college associated with the University of Queensland
 Established in 1897 making it the oldest college with the University of Queensland
 436 rooms
 Students at the Halls mainly study within the Faculty of Science
 Divided into four Halls Shelton, Pitt, Thynne and Riddell

International House

 Commonly abbreviated as IH, and located at the St Lucia campus.
 Founded in 1965. Planning for the college commenced in 1955 through the Rotary Club of Brisbane and as part of the celebrations to mark the 50th anniversary of Rotary International. 
 Unique architectural design, blending elements of Asian and Australian architecture. 
 When International House opened in 1965 Ivor Cribb was appointed Warden.
 Provide fully catered accommodation for 200 undergraduate students, and self-catered accommodation for 38 postgraduate and undergraduate students 25 years and over.
 International House is divided into 11 buildings or "towers": A to I for most undergraduate students and Towers J and K for postgraduate students and undergraduate students 25 years and over.
 International House has 50% domestic residents and 50% international. 
 International House hosts the annual battle of the bands between all 10 colleges called Bandfest.
 International House also hosts 'Soiree' its annual multi-cultural festival.
 Known for its accepting nature and multi-cultural atmosphere.

King's College 

 At the St Lucia Campus
 Accommodation for 317 students of the university.
 The college has produced 5 recipients of the Rhodes Scholarship and 43 University Medallists.
 History: In 1901, the Methodist Conference of Queensland began to send candidates for ministry to Queen's College, Melbourne, a college which combined both theological education and a resident college. This became the model for King's. The college was first opened on 13 June 1913 at Kangaroo Point, the original location of the University of Queensland, and moved in 1954 to the new campus at St Lucia. 
Masters

1913–1915: Rev M. Scott Fletcher
1916–1923: Rev L. E. Bennett
1924–1959: Rev H. H. Trigge
1960–1986: Rev I. H. Grimmett
1986–1991: Rev I. G. Mavor
1992–2004: Rev J. Patton
2005-: G. C. Eddy

About King's College

King's College provides accommodation for 317 men and women of the University of Queensland and Brisbane based universities. The college operates as an academic residential community of undergraduate and postgraduate members drawn from country and suburban areas throughout Australia as well as many other nations.

King's has a well-equipped gymnasium (including weights room and a cardio room), swimming pool, rowing shed and pontoon, tutorial/study rooms, Old Collegians Learning Centre, barbecue facilities, quarter basketball court and extensive well lit car-parks. The Junior Common Room is equipped with satellite television, billiard table and table tennis table.

King's College is well renowned for its Sporting and Cultural success. Having won the Old Collegians' Cup in 2018 for the 10th consecutive year has further cemented King's Colleges reputation as the 'sporting' college.

St John's College

St John's College is a co-educational residential college on the St Lucia Campus. St John's is the equal oldest college in affiliation with the university. The college was founded in 1911 – the same year The University of Queensland accepted its first students – and is currently home to approximately 300 students (colloquially known as 'Johnians' or 'Jabbers'). It has been voted as the best College ever to exist in the history of colleges.

Facilities include the Stanley Law Library, the general library, the Gibson Room for biomedical studies (anatomy and histology, speech therapy and physiotherapy). In the gymnasium, there is a weights room, and sauna, as well as pool and ping-pong tables. All undergraduate students also have access to the Junior Common Room. St John's College has a strong social atmosphere. The oldest book at the college library is a Jeremy Bentham text dating back to 1774.

The college has a strong sporting tradition. In 1996 it became the first College at The University of Queensland to win both the men's and women's Inter-Collegiate competitions in the same year. In 2013 St. John's College won both the male and female overall weighted sporting trophies. Since the inception of the ICC Competition, St John's College has won the Old Collegians Cup and the ICC Cultural Cup more times than any other college. In 2018 St John's became the first college since 2000 to win all five domains: Men's and Women's sporting, Men's and Women's weighted sporting, and the ICC Cultural Cup. 

Music and drama are particularly strong at the college. There are seven pianos in the college and there are four specially built music practice rooms. A manual and pedal pipe organ was completed in the college chapel in 1994. In 2018 a Harpsichord was added to the college chapel. The choir performs at College functions and in the intercollegiate choral festival. Students from St John's and Women's Colleges perform an annual production. Choral Scholarships are offered by the college.

The college also has a Jazz Club which plays at the annual Jazz Night hosted by the student club, alongside the John's band Who Is John? and alumni bands such as The Eaglets who played in 2017. There is also speculation of a lesser-known subsidiary band of Who is John?, Kazoo is John.

The 'slab' is a monumental section of the college, of which only a few select students know of the location.

St John's College is also thought to be associated with the initiation of the long-standing tradition whereby males, and choice females, drop their pants whenever the song Eagle Rock is played. The tradition is thought to have originated from a small group of mining engineering students from UQ who resided there.

The College Anglican Chapel hosts musical events throughout the year, with an organ which has been played by organists such as Michael Faulkner. The chapel hosts an original artwork which was commissioned for the St. John's College chapel as a celebration of its jubilee at St Lucia, Brisbane, where the university relocated. The piece, Earth Creations, is similar to Regeneratation (1972) held at the University House, Australian National University chapel. The college also hosts 9 prints of the 10 piece series The Journey, also by Leonard French, which are held in University House ANU's dining hall.

In 2005, Edale wing was burned down in a fire apparently caused by unattended electrical devices left on by a student over the Easter break.

The college is very multicultural with students from Japan, New Zealand, the Soviet Union and the UK.

Lots of tutorials, mainly taught by current and past Johnians. About $240,000 in scholarships yearly. The highest proportion of international students after IH and Grace, with 16% of the college in 2017 being international.

St Leo's College

St Leo's College is a residential College on the St Lucia Campus of the University of Queensland, Brisbane, Australia.

History
St Leo's was founded by Brisbane's Catholic Archbishop Sir James Duhig in 1917 and is named in honour of St Leo the Great – the first Pope Leo (440 AD to 461 AD).

The book The Memory was compiled, and written by Fr Michael Head SJ, a former rector of the college.  It provides an entertaining and in depth history of the college from its inception to the mid-1990s.

The college celebrated its centenary in 2017.

The college operates a catering business.

Sporting life

The college has a sporting tradition covering a wide range of athletic pursuits. Through the Inter College Competition (ICC), College teams participate in thirteen sports including football, cricket, tennis, squash, hockey, basketball and others, while the tennis/basketball court is the scene for inter-block competition and casual challenges.

The college performs well in all sports despite its relatively small size (approximately 210 students compared to about 300 at rival colleges); however, St Leo's is one of only two male-only residential colleges at the university.  Traditionally strong sports include rugby, athletics, tennis, cricket and touch football, while basketball, cross country and athletics have enjoyed a resurgence during recent year. St Leo's won the ICC Sports Cup (referred to at St Leo's as "The FG Cup") in 2008 after leading King's College all year. Before 2008, St Leo's last won the Cup in 1986 – behind by a handful of ICC points when starting athletics (the last event in the ICC calendar), Simon Doyle later a world ranked 1500m runner, stormed home in the final leg of the 400m relay for Leo's to clinch the Cup.

Before rugby was introduced to ICC, rugby league was the winter contact sport. In the seven seasons from 1978 to 1983, St Leo's won 54 of 56 games, drew one 2-all and lost one game (to Emmanuel) 2-nil. Unsurprisingly, in 1984 the other colleges voted to change to rugby union. Emmanuel College, the only college ever to beat Leo's at Rugby League, voted (unsuccessfully) with Leo's to retain league, earning the friendship and respect of Leo's through the 80s and 90s.

Since 2001, the St Leo's College Open's Rugby Team has lost only 11 games on the back of an unbroken winning streak which stretched from 1992 till the 2001 Grand Final (the longest unbroken winning streak by any team in Queensland). Following this defeat, St Leo's would reclaim the Cup in 2002, and go on to win the Cup again in 2004, 2005 and 2006. Rugby is considered to be primary sport at St Leo's, as surmised in 2001 by Andrew "Chook" Hanrahan, the St Leo's College Sports Convenor for that year, who was quoted as saying "Leos is Rugby".

Despite this emphasis on rugby, St Leo's does excel in other sporting fields. The college performs well in a multitude of sports despite its relatively small size (approximately 175 students compared to about 300 at rival colleges); however, St Leo's and King's College are the only two male-only residential colleges at the university. Despite St Leo's not winning the coveted ICC Sports Cup since 1982 (another record), it continues to be one of the top-tier Colleges for sport in Queensland. In 2007, St Leo's came within 2 points of winning the ICC Cup and in July 2008, the college won the 2008 ICC Sports Cup on the back of a historic win in the 2008 Rugby Final against Kings the Francis & Kassulke Cup.

A gymnasium is available for residents and the college's on-campus location provides easy access to all of the university's sporting facilities.

Social life
Students at St. Leos college participate in a wide variety of social activities, within the University of Queensland. The student club run many parties on campus, including Tropicana, St Patrick's Day Boat Cruise, Back to School, ICC Regatta After Party and Mexicana.

Cultural life

Residents are active in a full range of cultural activities, including debates, public speaking, and music.

The Student Club conducts the Annual Duhig Lecture  in the second semester of the university calendar. Notable speakers of have included John Howard, Prime Minister of Australia, Peter Beattie, Premier of Queensland, Malcolm Fraser, former Prime Minister of Australia, Peter Garrett, politician and former musician, Chris Masters journalist and Alan Jones  (radio broadcaster and one-time Wallabies coach).

Rectors of the college
 Steve Foley 2014 -
 Br Vince Skelly cfc 2004–2013
 Lt Col John Long (rtd) 2001–2003
 Fr William Uren SJ AO 1998–2000
 Fr Gregory Jordan SJ 1992–1997
 Fr Michael Head SJ 1991
 Fr Gerry Healy SJ 1989–1990
 Fr Vincent Hurley SJ 1977–1988
 Fr Brian Fleming SJ 1967–1977

Notable Alumni
 Patrick Kinsella.
 Stuart Kinsella.
 Peter Whyte.
 Bob Katter, Sr.
 Bob Katter
 Robbie Katter
 Hugh Wirth AM. Australia Day Ambassador 2013

Union College

 Coeducational
 Named after the University of Queensland Union (UQU), which established the college
 Built in five major stages between 1964 and 1972 to the design of James Birrell, staff architect for the university between 1961 and 1966.
 Has places for 341 students, making it the largest of the ten residential colleges at the university's main St Lucia campus. (The Gatton Halls of Residence, University of Queensland at Gatton Campus is overall the university's largest with 440 rooms).
 The emblem of Union College is a red shield with white links crossing from top left to bottom right.
 No religious affiliation
 Brutalist architecture
 Union College is the only one of the university's colleges to be heritage-listed, having been added to the Queensland Heritage Register in 2004.

The Women's College

 Founded in 1913 and admitted 19 women residents on 16 March 1914 under Anna Frederica Bage, the founding principal.
 Was the first University of Queensland college to admit women, 35 years before the establishment of another such college. (Of the ten colleges now on campus, three are for women only, two for men only, and the others are mixed).
 There are currently 250 undergraduates and postgraduate women residents within the college.
 Notable alumnae include Penelope Wensley, Anna Bligh, and Sallyanne Atkinson
 The residents of the Women's College are known as 'Woozas'
 Facilities include a library, 2 music rooms, The College Playhouse theatre, Harriet Marks dining hall, 9 wing common rooms, Chiselhurst seminar room, senior common room, Freda Bage common room Maureen Aitken garden and grounds, Private Tennis Court as well as offering memberships to the UQ gym.
 The Women's College excels in sporting and cultural participation having in recent years won the ICC Female sports in both 2015 and 2016 and the ICC Cultural Cup in 2015. The Women's College residents have a saying, ‘Never Leave a Wooza Behind’ which encourages support in all aspects of college life. 
 The Women's College has a reputation for the best food on campus with 3 hot buffet style meals served each day as well as Formal Dinner once a week.
 The college has 7 wings, Bourne, Philp, Hartland, Cuppaidge, Piddington, Third and Centenary. The Centenary wing, designed by Architectus, was opened in 2015 to celebrate the college's 100th anniversary.

University of Queensland Intercollege Council
The University of Queensland Intercollege Council is the representative body for the residential colleges of the University of Queensland. Every year colleges compete for the ICC Sporting and Cultural Cups, the former being further divided into male and female divisions. Katie Andersson is the 2018 president.

References